14 Andromedae b (abbreviated 14 And b), formally named Spe , is an exoplanet approximately 249 light years away in the constellation of Andromeda.

The 186-day period planet orbits about 83% the Earth-Sun distance from the giant star 14 Andromedae. It has a minimum mass 4.8 times the mass of Jupiter. The planet orbits with an eccentricity of 0.0094, which means the orbital distance over the course of its revolution varies by only 0.02 AU.

Nomenclature
In July 2014 the International Astronomical Union launched NameExoWorlds, a process for giving proper names to certain exoplanets and their host stars. The process involved public nomination and voting for the new names. In December 2015, the IAU announced the name Spe for this planet. The winning name was based on that submitted by the Thunder Bay Centre of the Royal Astronomical Society of Canada); namely 'Spes', Latin for 'hope'. (Spes was also the Roman goddess of hope.) The IAU substituted the ablative form 'Spe', which means 'where there is hope', to match that given to the host star at the same time.

Discovery
The preprint announcing 14 Andromedae b was submitted to the arXiv electronic repository on July 2, 2008, by Bun'ei Sato and collaborators, who discovered it using the Doppler Spectroscopy method, during the Okayama Planet Search radial velocity survey of G and K giants at Okayama Astrophysical Observatory.

See also
 81 Ceti b
 6 Lyncis b

References

External links
 
 

Andromeda (constellation)
Giant planets
Exoplanets discovered in 2008
Exoplanets detected by radial velocity
Exoplanets with proper names